Paul Pavlowitch (born February 5, 1942) is a French writer, editor and journalist.

Biography
Pavlowitch was born in Nice. Presented as his "nephew" by Romain Gary, he is the son of Dinah Owczyńska, first cousin of Gary, Paul being therefore the second cousin of the latter.

A grant enabled him to study law in Toulouse and Paris (1964); after obtaining the license, a stay in an American university is financed by the writer who considers him a bit like his son. After having been a librarian at the Arago high school in Paris, Pavlowitch became a “copyist” then an English translator for various publishing houses, an editor at the Mercure de France, a publishing house run by Simone Gallimard.

The Emile Ajar affair
Pavlowitch is famous for having endorsed, in the early 1970s, the pseudonym of Émile Ajar at the request of Romain Gary, who wanted to write under another name; Pavlowitch thus played for eight years the author of the novels Gros-Câlin, La Vie devant soi, Pseudo and L'Angoisse du roi Salomon, actually written by his “uncle”. Émile Ajar won the Prix Goncourt in 1975, a reward he ultimately did not refuse. Gradually, journalists established the relationship between Ajar-Pavlowitch and Romain Gary. The latter then imagines, mischievously, a confession of Ajar. The result is Pseudo (1976), a novel featuring a mysterious, tyrannical, egocentric uncle named Tonton Macoute, in which everyone can recognize Gary. Violent and comical, this novel analyzes the intricacies of literary creation.

But the links between Paul Pavlowitch, who got caught up in the writer's game, and Romain Gary (who signed a contract with Mercure de France for five books by Ajar) are deteriorating. The latter calls on his lawyer to formalize an arrangement: 40% of his royalties go to Pavlowitch who, in exchange, guarantees the secrecy of the agreement, and signs several letters to Romain attesting that he is only 'a puppet.<ref>Michel Lafon, Benoît Peeters, Nous est un autre. Enquête sur les duos d'écrivains, Flammarion, 2006</ref>

In 1981, shortly after the death of Romain Gary on December 2, 1980, Paul Pavlowitch published a book under his name with Fayard editions, L'Homme que l'on croyait, where he gave his version of the adventure. On June 30, 1981, as a prelude to the release of this autobiography, he had the true identity of Ajar, published in an AFP press release. On July 3, 1981, he was invited on the set of the literary program Apostrophes by Bernard Pivot. A short posthumous text by Romain Gary, Vie et mort d'Émile Ajar (dated March 21, 1979), was published urgently on July 17.

A documentary directed by Philippe Kohly for French television (Le Roman du double), broadcast in 2010, describes with sympathy this unusual story which in its time aroused the hostility of some journalists and literary critics.

Paul Pavlowitch worked for L'Autre Journal, in the 1980"s and the 1990s, founded by Michel Butel. He also teaches in prison.

 Private life 
Father of two daughters, Anna, president of Flammarion and Éditions Albin Michel, and Julia, director of Éditions Phébus and Libretto.

 Books 
 L’Homme que l’on croyait, document, Fayard, 1981
 La Peau de l’ours, roman, Mazarine, 1986
 Victor, document, Fayard, 2000
 Céline, roman, Fayard, 2002
 Un autre monde, roman, Fayard, 2004
 Tom'', roman, Ramsay, 2005

References

External links 
 Émission Apostrophes du 3 juillet 1981 consacrée à Paul Pavlowitch et à l'affaire Émile Ajar

French writers
French journalists
1942 births
Living people